Sudhir G. Joshi (25 May 1940 – 17 February 2022) was an Indian politician from the state of Maharashtra and
a senior leader of the Shiv Sena political party. He was a cabinet minister in Government of Maharashtra led by Manohar Joshi. He held Revenue and School Education portfolios. He was Mayor of Mumbai in 1973–74.

Background and Family Information
Joshi was born to Indira Joshi and Gajanan Joshi, a businessman and owner of a local eatery in Dadar, Mumbai. He was married to Suhasini Joshi on 10 June 1965, and has a son, Preshit Joshi. He graduated with a Bachelor of Science degree in Chemistry from D. G. Ruparel College in Matunga.

Career

Political
Joshi started his political career by getting elected as a Corporator in the Brihanmumbai Municipal Corporation (BMC) in 1968. In the BMC elections of 1973, the Shiv Sena-Republican Party of India alliance won a majority. Hence, Joshi was elected to the post of Corporator for another term of 5 years. In the wake of this victory, he was elected to the post of Mayor of Mumbai with the support of one Congress faction, the RPI and even some Corporators of the Muslim League. He remained in office till 1974, after which he resumed his duties as a Corporator till 1978. He was the first Mayor belonging to the Shiv Sena.

In 1986, he was elected as a Member of Maharashtra Legislative Council (Vidhan Parishad) in the state of Maharashtra. He held this position till 1999. During this period, from 1992 to 1995, he was the Leader of Opposition in the Vidhan Parishad. In 1995, when the Shiv Sena-BJP alliance came to power, he was allotted the portfolios of Revenue Minister and School Education Minister. Joshi had been the President of the Sthaniya Lokadhikar Samiti (SLS) for 20 years, since 1977. In 1997, after holding the two ministerial portfolios for two years, he resigned from the post of the SLS President. Under his leadership, the SLS had established and secured jobs for many native Maharashtrians in Mumbai's 5 star hotels, banks, the insurance sector, multinational companies, and most importantly, Air India.

After Joshi met with an accident, however, the Revenue portfolio was given to Narayan Rane; when Joshi recovered and resumed office, the Revenue portfolio was not returned. He still held the School Education portfolio till his MLC term expired in July 1999. After this, he retired from active politics.

Social
Joshi held leadership positions in various organisations in the state of Maharashtra.

Death
Joshi died in Mumbai on 17 February 2022, at the age of 81 from post Covid-19 complications.

See also
Mayor of Mumbai
Shiv Sena
Government of Maharashtra
Brihanmumbai Municipal Corporation

References

1940 births
2022 deaths
Shiv Sena politicians
Mayors of Mumbai
State cabinet ministers of Maharashtra
Politicians from Mumbai
Marathi politicians
Leaders of the Opposition in the Maharashtra Legislative Council
Deaths from the COVID-19 pandemic in India